Slamet Riyadi is an Indonesian footballer.

References

External links
 

Indonesian footballers
Persela Lamongan players
2000 AFC Asian Cup players
Living people
1981 births
PSMS Medan players
PSPS Pekanbaru players
Persema Malang players
Sriwijaya F.C. players
Persikabo Bogor players
PSSB Bireuen players
PS Mojokerto Putra players
Semen Padang F.C. players
Madura United F.C. players
Persijap Jepara players
Liga 1 (Indonesia) players
Indonesian Premier League players
Indonesian Premier Division players
Association football defenders
Indonesia international footballers
People from Lamongan Regency
Sportspeople from East Java